Jagiroad Assembly constituency is one of the 126 assembly constituencies of Assam Legislative Assembly. Jagiroad forms part of the Nowgong Lok Sabha constituency and is reserved for the Scheduled Caste candidates.

Members of Legislative Assembly
 1978: Prasad Chandra Dalai, Indian National Congress
 1985: Motiram Das, Asom Gana Parishad
 1991: Bubul Das, Asom Gana Parishad
 1996: Bubul Das, Asom Gana Parishad
 2001: Bubul Das, Asom Gana Parishad
 2006: Bibekananda Dalai, Indian National Congress
 2011: Bibekananda Dalai, Indian National Congress
 2016: Pijush Hazarika, Bharatiya Janata Party
 2021: Pijush Hazarika, Bharatiya Janata Party

See also
 Morigaon district
 List of constituencies of Assam Legislative Assembly

References

External links 
 

Assembly constituencies of Assam
Morigaon district